The Musée des tramways à vapeur et des chemins de fer secondaires français (Museum of French steam tramways and secondary railways — MTVS) is located alongside Valmondois railway station, in the small town of Butry-sur-Oise in the departement of Val-d'Oise,  north of Paris. 
The museum houses a collection of railway vehicles from the former French departmental railways, preserved, restored and rebuilt by the members of an association. During the season, short trips can be made on some of the exhibits, at a separate location in the town of Crèvecoeur le Grand, along a metre gauge line, three kilometers (1.86 miles) in length, nicknamed the "Impressionists' railway".

History
Established in 1976 on the site of the former railway line from Valmondois to the town of Marines, the 'Association of the Transportation Museum of the Sausseron Valley' patiently assembled a collection of railway vehicles from the old regional French networks. The collection has become the most important in France on the theme of secondary railways using the one metre gauge.

It is interesting to note the museum was kickstarted by the rescue of two "tram" locomotives, n°16 and 60 seen below, abandoned in a forest, originally from the Tramways de la Sarthe in the west of France.

In 1999, the association changed its name to the Musée des Tramways à Vapeur et des chemins de fer Secondaires français.

In October 2006, the association celebrated its thirtieth anniversary.

It was once planned for the museum to be moved further northwest, to the Vexin region, where it would have had larger storage space and a longer railway line to use for its train journeys, but the project was abandoned in March 2009.

During the winter of 2007-08, the terminus of the small passenger line became inaccessible when large rocks fell onto the track. Journeys were restricted to the Rue de Parmain.

Since 2013 a project is under way to transfer the museum to Crèvecœur-le-Grand, called the "Train à Vapeur du Beauvaisis", it is now the association's main activity center.

Collection

It operates :

 11 steam engines including :
 Tramway de la Sarthe Nº 60, an 0-6-0 steam tram locomotive by the Ateliers du Nord de la France, Blanc-Misseron (Nº 213 of 1898), the first railway vehicle classified as a Monument historique
 Chemin de Fer des Côtes-du-Nord Nº 36, an 0-6-0T by Corpet-Louvet (Nº 1679 of 1925), classified as a Monument historique
Tramway d'Ille et Vilaine n°75, a 0-6-0 steam tram locomotive built by Corpet-Louvet in 1909, also classified as MH
 5 diesel locotractors
 1 electric railcar (automotrice électrique)
 3 diesel railcars (autorail)
 27 passenger cars; among which :
3 come from the Tramways d'Ille et Vilaine (bodies of the cars TIV B34, B 37 and B 73, circulating on the platforms of flatbed wagons)
2 from the Tramways de la Sarthe, (bodies of cars B36 and B56)
 3 luggage cars
 about 30 freight cars

Thirty vehicles of the collection are Monuments Historiques and 2 are inscribed in the supplementary inventory of the Monuments historiques.

Steam engines

Timetable
The museum is open from the beginning of May to the first weekend in October from 14:30 to 18:00 on Sundays.

A yearly festival is organized during the first weekend of October.

Address
Musée des Tramways à Vapeur et des chemins de fer Secondaires français
Mairie de Butry
95430 Butry-sur-Oise

Train à Vapeur du Beauvaisis

Place de la gare

60360 Crèvecoeur-Le-Grand

References

External links
 Museum web site 

Heritage railways in France
Railway museums in France
Museums in Val-d'Oise
Transport in Île-de-France
Metre gauge railways in France